Holy Transfiguration Church is an Eastern Orthodox church in Kėdainiai.

The first, wooden Orthodox church in Kėdainiai was constructed in 1643. From 1652 it belonged to an Orthodox monastery of the Holy Transfiguration, which was destroyed by fire in 1771. After this event the monastery was never rebuilt and the monks moved to the Holy Spirit Monastery in Vilnius. In 1798 it was officially closed. Despite the advice of the Holy Synod of the Russian Orthodox Church, the remaining church was not made a parish church because of the tiny number of Orthodox Christians living permanently in Kėdainiai. The services were held there only occasionally, wherever a Russian military unit arrived to the town.

In 1841 this situation changed together with the arrival of more Russians to the town. In 1895 the church also turned out to be too tiny and it was replaced by the one which was preserved up to today. During World War I, the church was abandoned. Only in 1918 new parish clergy arrived to Kėdainiai. It was registered as an active parish by the Soviet government in 1947, with 230 parishioners at this moment.

Sources 
 G. Shlevis, Православные храмы Литвы, Свято-Духов Монастыр, Vilnius 2006, 

Buildings and structures in Kėdainiai
Eastern Orthodox churches in Lithuania